The A Grupė is highest level of women's volleyball club tournament in Lithuania. Current champions is Achema-KKSC from Jonava.

History 

From 1935 to 1943 Volleyball Championships of Kaunas City was held. First national-wide championships were held in 1947. Teams from Kaunas won the most titles.

Teams

References

External links 
 Lithuanian Volleyball Federation
  Lithuanian League. women.volleybox.net 

Volleyball leagues in Lithuania
Lithuania
Lithuania